KOB (channel 4) is a television station in Albuquerque, New Mexico, United States, affiliated with NBC. It is owned by Hubbard Broadcasting, whose sister cable channel Reelz is also based in Albuquerque (KOB and Reelz, however, maintain separate operations and facilities). KOB's studios are located on Broadcast Plaza just west of downtown, and its transmitter is located on Sandia Crest, east of Albuquerque.

History

KOB-TV started operations on November 29, 1948, after Albuquerque Journal owner and publisher Tom Pepperday won a television license on his second try. Pepperday, who also owned KOB radio (770 AM), had previously applied for one in 1943. It was the first television station in New Mexico, as well as the third television station between the Mississippi River and the West Coast (behind WBAP-TV (now KXAS-TV) in Fort Worth, and KDYL-TV (now KTVX) in Salt Lake City). Initially, channel 4 ran programming from all four networks—NBC, ABC, CBS and DuMont. However, it has always been a primary NBC affiliate owing to its radio sister's long affiliation with NBC radio.

Later, in May 1952, the KOB stations were purchased by magazine publisher Time-Life (later Time Inc.) and former Federal Communications Commission (FCC) chairman Wayne Coy. It was Time-Life's first television asset. In 1953, two new TV stations signed on within a week—KGGM-TV (channel 13, now KRQE), which affiliated with CBS, followed by KOAT, which took ABC; DuMont shut down in 1956.

Stanley E. Hubbard, founder of Hubbard Broadcasting, bought KOB-AM-TV from Time-Life in 1957, and his heirs have owned the station since. KOB's radio cousins were sold off in 1986 and are now known as KKOB and KOBQ. Despite the change, many people still confuse the television and radio stations today. In 2005, KOB-TV entered into a news partnership with KKOB.

Although the KOB radio stations had long amended their callsigns, KOB-TV did not drop the "-TV" suffix until June 13, 2009, when the FCC allowed a limited opportunity for stations to change their suffixes (adding "-TV" or "-DT") or drop them in the wake of the digital transition that was completed the previous day.

Programming

Syndicated programming
As of September 2020, syndicated programs broadcast on KOB include Rachael Ray, The Kelly Clarkson Show, Inside Edition, Access Hollywood and Judge Judy.

News operation
KOB broadcasts 32½ hours of locally produced newscasts each week (with 5½ hours each weekday, three hours on Saturdays, and two hours on Sundays). During the school year, KOB broadcasts a weekly 15-minute sportscast, New Mexico Gameday, dedicated to high school sports.

When KOAT's top anchorman, Dick Knipfing, was fired on June 4, 1979, KOB hired him to anchor their newscasts. Although KOAT sued to keep Knipfing off the air until the following year, an opinion from the United States District Court allowed the anchorman to proceed with his plans to begin anchoring channel 4 on August 1, creating the first big-dollar anchor in Albuquerque, and allowing him to stand out in the industry as the "anchorman wars" moved to smaller markets. Knipfing's salary at that time was approximately $90,000. However, channel 4 was never able to overtake KOAT in the news ratings.

KOB produced an hour-long nightly newscast for Albuquerque's then-Fox affiliate, KASA-TV, from September 2000 through September 14, 2006, called Fox 2 News at Nine. The next day, KRQE took over production of that newscast as that station's parent company, LIN TV, began taking over KASA's operations as it purchased the station.

On September 26, 2010, KOB began producing and broadcasting its newscasts in 16:9 widescreen standard definition, and debuted new on-air graphics and a new station logo (the logo used for its newscasts is very similar to that used by Swedish television channel TV4 for its programming) on that date as well.

On February 13, 2020, the 10 p.m. newscast was renamed KOB 4 NightBeat, switching the newscast from its former Eyewitness News format to a looser talk-based news format. It is believed that it will be only for the late newscast, but could expand depending on viewer input.

Technical information

Subchannels
The station's digital signal is multiplexed:

In September 2006, KOB-TV began broadcasting NBC WeatherPlus on digital subchannel 4.2, at first inserting its Doppler weather radar during time reserved for local segments. In December 2008, WeatherPlus was replaced with KOB's own locally programmed weather station. Weekly E/I programming required of broadcast television stations by the FCC came from NASA TV on weekend mornings.

On February 7, 2011, the subchannel began to carry programming from This TV. On June 30, 2016, Comet TV was added as a third digital channel, airing science fiction programs. On April 30, 2021, Decades was added as a fourth digital channel, airing decades on shows. In summer 2021, Defy TV and TrueReal were added as KOB's fifth and sixth digital channels. On October 15, 2021, KOBDT4's Decades was replaced with Heroes & Icons, shortly after it was dropped from KASA channel 29.1, but would later return to an added seventh digital channel on November 23. On December 30, 2021 KOB changed the line-up moving H&I to channel 4.2 while Decades returned to 4.4 with This TV moving to 4.7. On July 8, 2022 KOB added Newsy to digital channel 4.6, while TrueReal moved to channel 4.3 replacing Comet.

Analog-to-digital conversion
KOB-TV shut down its analog signal, over VHF channel 4, on June 12, 2009, the official date in which full-power television stations in the United States transitioned from analog to digital broadcasts under federal mandate. The station's digital signal remained on its pre-transition UHF channel 26. Through the use of PSIP, digital television receivers display the station's virtual channel as its former VHF analog channel 4.

As part of the SAFER Act, KOB-TV kept its analog signal on the air until June 30 to inform viewers of the digital television transition through a loop of public service announcements from the National Association of Broadcasters.

Satellite stations

Two stations rebroadcast KOB's signal and insert local content for other parts of the media market:

KOB formerly operated a third satellite station, KOBG-TV (channel 6) in Silver City, which signed on in 2000. KOBG had a permit to construct a digital station on channel 8, but these facilities were never built. After the digital transition on June 12, 2009, KOBG began operating with facilities on channel 12 identical to that of low-power translator stations under special temporary authority, and was formally replaced with a translator (K12QW-D) on April 26, 2011, though its license was not canceled until August 3.

The last letter of the satellite station callsigns stands for the city or county where the station is located. KOBG was in Grant County.

Translators

In February 2019, Las Cruces-based K42DJ, which was owned by the News-Press & Gazette Company and rebroadcast the Azteca América subchannel of El Paso, Texas-based KVIA-TV, was transferred to Hubbard and began to rebroadcast KOB instead as K22NM-D. This provided Las Cruces over-the-air access to an in-state NBC affiliate in addition to the main NBC affiliate serving Las Cruces, Nexstar's KTSM-TV.

References

External links
 
  – This TV New Mexico

Hubbard Broadcasting
NBC network affiliates
This TV affiliates
Scripps News affiliates
Heroes & Icons affiliates
Defy TV affiliates
TrueReal affiliates
Television channels and stations established in 1948
Mass media in Albuquerque, New Mexico
OB
1948 establishments in New Mexico